Alan Black may refer to:
Alan Black (basketball), former basketball player and basketball coach in the Australian National Basketball League
Alan Black (broadcaster) (1943–2007), British broadcaster and radio personality
Alan Black (footballer) (born 1943), Scottish association football player
 Alan Black (hunter), a big-game hunter for whom the term "white hunter" may have been coined
Alan W. Black, professor of computer science at Carnegie Mellon University

See also
Alan the Black (died 1098), English lord of the Honour of Richmond
Alan, 1st Earl of Richmond (before 1100–1146), or "Alan the Black", Breton noble